Si Nakhon is a district (amphoe) of Sukhothai province, in the lower northern region of Thailand. It may also be spelled Sri Nakhon.

Geography
Neighboring districts are (from the south clockwise): Sawankhalok and Si Satchanalai of Sukhothai Province, and Tron and Phichai of Uttaradit province.

History
The minor district (king amphoe) Si Nakhon was established on 20 January 1976, then consisting of the two tambons: Si Sakhon and Nakhon Doet of Sawankhalok district. It was upgraded to a full district on 13 July 1981.

Administration
The district is divided into five sub-districts (tambons), which are further subdivided into 49 villages (mubans). The township (thesaban tambon) Si Nakhon covers parts of tambon Si Nakhon. There are a further five tambon administrative organizations (TAO).

References

External links
http://www.geocities.com/srinakhorn (Archived 2009-10-25) (Thai only)
amphoe.com

Si Nakhon